Takht Arreh may refer to:
 Takht Arreh 1
 Takht Arreh 2